Karl Rafreider (6 March 1917 – 14 January 2003) was an Austrian cross-country skier who competed in the late 1940s and early 1950s. Competing in three Winter Olympics in the 4 x 10 km relay, his best finish was fourth at St. Moritz in 1948. He was born in Brixen.

References
Wallechinsky, David. (1984). The Complete Book of the Olympics: 1896-1980. "4x10-kilometer relay". New York: Penguin Books. p. 617.
Karl Rafreider's profile at Sports Reference.com

External links
 

1917 births
2003 deaths
Austrian male cross-country skiers
Olympic cross-country skiers of Austria
Cross-country skiers at the 1948 Winter Olympics
Cross-country skiers at the 1952 Winter Olympics
Cross-country skiers at the 1956 Winter Olympics
Sportspeople from Brixen
20th-century Austrian people